Carl Adolph von Basedow (28 March 1799 – 11 April 1854) was a German physician most famous for reporting the symptoms of what could later be dubbed Graves-Basedow disease, now technically known as exophthalmic goiter.

Biography
Basedow was born in Dessau.  He graduated from Halle University.  He subsequently began general practice in Merseburg in 1822.  He married early and became the town's chief medical officer, a position he would hold for the rest of his life.  In 1840, Basedow reported on the conditions of what is now called Graves-Basedow disease.  He died in Merseburg in 1854 after contracting spotted fever from a corpse he was dissecting.

Medical work
Basedow has three eponymous medical conditions: Basedow's coma, a thyreotoxic coma; Basedow's ocular syndromes, the unilateral retraction of the upper lid in Basedow’s syndrome; and, Graves-Basedow disease, a disorder characterized by the "Merseburger triad": tachycardia, goitre, and exophthalmos.  The term "Basedow’s disease" was suggested by Georg Hirsch in his Klinische Fragmente.

References
 Karl Adolph von Basedow at WhoNamedIt.com
 

1799 births
1854 deaths
People from Dessau-Roßlau
People from Anhalt-Dessau
German general practitioners
Mark Family (descendants of Karl)